Eoghan O'Connell (born 13 August 1995) is an Irish professional footballer who plays as a defender for Wrexham. He began his youth playing career in the Republic of Ireland, joined the academy of Scottish club Celtic in 2011 and made his first-team debut three years later. While at the club he was loaned to Oldham Athletic, Cork City and Walsall. In 2017, he signed with English third-tier club Bury and after two seasons with The Shakers, he moved in the summer of 2019 to Rochdale before moving to Charlton Athletic in 2022. On 31 January 2023, Deadline Day, he moved to National League club Wrexham.

O'Connell is a cousin of former Irish rugby captain Paul O'Connell and has been capped at  youth international level.

Club career

Celtic
O'Connell played for the College Corinthians and Avondale United Irish academy teams, before switching to the Celtic Academy in 2011. On 9 January 2014, he made his first-team debut in a 3–1 victory over Turkish club Trabzonspor in the Turkish Airlines Antalya Cup. In March, he made his competitive debut against Ross County in a 1–1 draw in the Scottish Premiership. Speaking in April 2015 about his debut, he said, "Making my debut at the end of last season was a good thing as it gave me a good platform coming into the next season and show what I could do".

O'Connell started the 2014–15 season by scoring an own goal in a 1–0 league defeat against Inverness CT. After making four appearances for the club in the season and captaining the youth team in a friendly against Sparta Prague, on 2 February 2015 he signed a contract extension that would keep him at Celtic until mid-2017. Commenting about the new contract, he said, "I'm delighted and just happy to get it done". At the end of the season, he was named as the club's Academy Player of the Year. Irish newspaper TheJournal.ie included Connell in their list of "10 most promising young Irish footballers".

O'Connell played his first match of the 2015–16 season, a 3–1 victory over Dundee United, in August. He moved to English League One club Oldham Athletic on a six-month loan deal on 1 September. Five days later, he made his first-team debut, playing the entirety of a 2–1 victory over Bradford City. He was injured after featuring in another match for Oldham, and returned to his parent club in November.

In February 2016, O'Connell went on-loan to his home-town club, League of Ireland side Cork City. Manager John Caulfield said O'Connell's signing "injects extra competition into the squad". He made his debut on 27 February, playing the whole match, in which Cork defeated Dundalk 2–0 in the President's Cup. He played five times for Cork, scoring once in a 2–2 draw with Galway United, before being recalled to Celtic at the end of April 2016 after sustaining a groin injury. 

On 27 July 2016, O'Connell made his UEFA Champions League debut, playing the whole ninety minutes of a 1–1 draw against Kazakh club FC Astana in the qualifiers. Speaking about his debut, manager Brendan Rodgers said O'Connell was "outstanding" and added; "For a young player, he has been on the fringes for a few years, coming into that environment, under pressure, he had very few mistakes in the game". He featured for the club in the return leg and again earned the praise of Rodgers.

After playing six matches for Celtic during the 2016–17 season, on 12 January 2017, O'Connell was loaned to English League One club Walsall for the rest of the season. He debuted in a 4–1 victory over Sheffield United; Walsall manager Jon Whitney said O'Connell "grew into the game and showed why we brought him in." On 21 January, he scored his first goal in a 3–1 victory over Bristol Rovers. He made 17 appearances for the club.

Bury
O'Connell signed a three-year contract with English League One club Bury on 8 June 2017. He said about his move; "I have come to the stage in my career where I just want to play football all the time. The manager made it clear that he had a big interest in me and wanted me to come to the club." He added that he was happy with the move and he wanted to start playing. O'Connell was injured during the pre-season and was ruled out of play for up to ten weeks. In October he made his first-team debut in a 1–0 victory over Blackburn Rovers in the EFL Trophy. Wearing the number six shirt, he has become a first team regular in 2018–19 under manager Ryan Lowe.

Rochdale
On 4 July 2019, O'Connell signed a two-year contract with Rochdale.

On 22 June 2021, O'Connell signed a new one-year contract.

Charlton Athletic
On 20 June 2022, O'Connell signed a three-year contract with Charlton Athletic on a free transfer following the expiration of his contract at Rochdale.

Wrexham
On 31 January 2023, O'Connell signed for Wrexham.

International career
O'Connell made his Republic of Ireland under-19 debut against Norway in August 2013. In September 2016, he was called to the Republic of Ireland under-21 national football team by manager Noel King for 2017 UEFA European Under-21 Championship qualifiers against Slovenia and Serbia. On 2 September, he made his under-21 international debut in a 2–0 win against Slovenia.

Style of play
O'Connell plays as a centre back. During his time with Celtic, the Herald Scotland described him as "an assured ball-playing centre-half with an air of calmness around him which has belied his lack of experience." His manager at Celtic, Brendan Rodgers, said O'Connell had an "in-built brain for the game."

Personal life
O'Connell hails from Cork and is a supporter of local side Cork City. He is a cousin of former Irish rugby captain Paul O'Connell. Both his father Damo O'Connell and brother Andy O'Connell have played for Cork City.

Career statistics

Honours
Cork City
President of Ireland's Cup: 2016

Bury
EFL League Two runner-up: 2018–19
Individual

 Rochdale Player of the Season: 2019–20, 2021–22

References

External links

1995 births
Living people
Association football defenders
Republic of Ireland association footballers
Republic of Ireland under-21 international footballers
Expatriate footballers in Scotland
Republic of Ireland expatriate association footballers
Irish expatriate sportspeople in England
Irish expatriate sportspeople in Scotland
Association footballers from County Cork
Celtic F.C. players
Oldham Athletic A.F.C. players
Cork City F.C. players
Scottish Professional Football League players
Republic of Ireland youth international footballers
College Corinthians A.F.C. players
League of Ireland players
English Football League players
Walsall F.C. players
Bury F.C. players
Rochdale A.F.C. players
Charlton Athletic F.C. players
Wrexham A.F.C. players